The Endowment House was an early building used by the Church of Jesus Christ of Latter-day Saints (LDS Church) to administer temple ordinances in Salt Lake City, Utah Territory. From the construction of the Council House in 1852, Salt Lake City's first public building, until the construction of the Endowment House, the members of the LDS Church used the top floor of the Council House for administering temple ordinances. When this arrangement proved impractical, Brigham Young directed Truman O. Angell, architect of the Salt Lake Temple, to design a temporary temple. Completed in 1855, the building was dedicated by Heber C. Kimball and came to be called the Endowment House after the endowment ceremonies that were conducted inside it.

Appearance
The Endowment House stood on the northwest corner of Temple Square. Initially, it was a two-story adobe building, with a single-story  extension on its north side. In 1856, another extension was added on its south side and a baptistry on its west side.

Inside, the Endowment House was the first building designed specifically for administering temple ordinances. Earlier buildings used for such purposes—such as Joseph Smith’s Red Brick Store in Nauvoo; the Nauvoo Temple; and the Council House—only had temporary canvas partitions. The Endowment House had the typical ordinance rooms found in some later temples: a creation room; a garden room; a world room; a celestial room; and sealing rooms. In 1856, William Ward painted the walls of the creation room to represent the Garden of Eden, the first such temple mural. It was one of the first buildings in Utah to have indoor bathrooms.

Uses
The Endowment House was used primarily for performing temple ordinances. From 1857 to 1876 the baptismal font was used to perform 134,053 baptisms for the dead.  Between 1855 and 1884 54,170 persons received their washings and anointings and endowments. Between 1855 and 1889 68,767 couples were sealed in marriage—31,052 for the living and 37,715 for the dead.

Members of the LDS Church did not consider the Endowment House a temple, so they did not perform all temple ordinances in it. Brigham Young explained, "We can, at the present time [1873], go into the Endowment House and be baptized for our dead, receive our washings and anointings, etc. ... We also have the privilege of sealing women to men without a Temple ... but when we come to other sealing ordinances, ordinances pertaining to the holy Priesthood, to connect the chain of the Priesthood from father Adam until now, by sealing children to their parents, being sealed for our forefathers, etc., they cannot be done without a temple". Hence, there were no sealing of children nor endowments for the dead performed in the Endowment House. These ordinances were first administered in Utah's first temple, in St. George, in 1877.

The Endowment House was also used for other purposes, including prayer circles, settings apart, and instructing missionaries before their departure, as well as meetings of the various church leaders, such as the First Presidency and Quorum of the Twelve Apostles.

Demolition
The Endowment House became a casualty of the anti-polygamy campaign of the U.S. Federal Government, especially the Edmunds–Tucker Act of 1887, which disincorporated the LDS Church and allowed the federal government to seize all of its assets. In response, church leaders ceased performing new plural marriages. In October 1889, Wilford Woodruff, President of the Church, heard that an unauthorized sealing had occurred in the Endowment House. Woodruff ordered the building razed in October 1889. The Salt Lake Tribune, in its issue dated November 17, 1889, reported that the building was "being demolished". By the end of the month all trace of the Endowment House was gone. Some two years later, Woodruff issued the 1890 Manifesto, officially ending the Mormon practice of polygamy, which had been so firmly associated in the mind of the public with the Endowment House.

Other Endowment Houses

The Endowment House at Salt Lake City may not have been the only non-temple structure used for administering temple ordinances in Utah. One of these is a building known as the "Endowment House" in Spring City, Utah, built by Orson Hyde. The building is still standing at 85 West 300 South. Local records indicate that this building was a Relief Society hall. It is unclear whether it was ever used to administer temple ordinances.

See also

 Adam-ondi-Ahman
 Council House (Salt Lake City)
 Holy of Holies (LDS Church)
 List of historic sites of The Church of Jesus Christ of Latter-day Saints
 Sacred Grove (Latter Day Saint movement)
 Temple (LDS Church)

Notes

References
.
.
.
.

External links

19th-century Latter Day Saint temples
Demolished buildings and structures in Utah
Former Latter Day Saint religious buildings and structures
Former religious buildings and structures in Utah
Religious buildings and structures in Salt Lake City
Religious buildings and structures completed in 1855
Temple Square
Temples (LDS Church) in Utah
Defunct organizational subdivisions of the Church of Jesus Christ of Latter-day Saints
20th-century Mormonism
1855 establishments in Utah Territory
Buildings and structures demolished in 1889
Churches completed in 1855